Michael Krause (born 24 July 1946 in Magdeburg) is a German former field hockey player who competed in the 1968 Summer Olympics, in the 1972 Summer Olympics, and in the 1976 Summer Olympics.

References

External links
 

1946 births
Living people
German male field hockey players
Olympic field hockey players of West Germany
Field hockey players at the 1968 Summer Olympics
Field hockey players at the 1972 Summer Olympics
Field hockey players at the 1976 Summer Olympics
Olympic gold medalists for West Germany
Olympic medalists in field hockey
Sportspeople from Magdeburg
Medalists at the 1972 Summer Olympics
20th-century German people